Çikatovë e Vjetër (/Staro Čikatovo) is a village and quarry near Glogovac in Kosovo.

Alternative names
The village has a number of names in both Albanian and Serbian. 

In Albanian, alternative names include:
Qikatovë e Vjetër 
Çikatova

In Serbian, alternatives are:
Ćikatovo (Ћикатово) 
Čikalovo (Чикалово)

Notes

References 

Villages in Drenas
Quarries in Kosovo